José Antonio Ramírez López (1908–1987) was a Spanish jurist and lawyer, author of a doctrinal study on the legal regime of bankruptcy.

Works 

 Los huéspedes de El Mundo (1936)
 Notas y adiciones de Derecho español al Tratado de Derecho de quiebras de Renzo Provinciali (1958)
 Derecho Concursal Español. La Quiebra (1959 1.ª ed.; 1998 2.ª ed.)
 Caín, ensayo (1967)
 La atalaya indiscreta (1968)
 El saco roto (1969)
 El Derecho llama a tu puerta (1970)
 Cartas de un abogado a las mujeres de España (1973)
 El laberinto de los afanes (1974)
 Las andanzas del Diablo. Confidencias de un abogado ingenuo (1975).

References 
 Olivencia Ruiz, Manuel: ‹‹Prólogo››, La Quiebra, J. A. Ramírez, Bosch, Barcelona, 1998.
 Vargas Vasserot, Carlos: "Voz Ramírez López, José Antonio", Diccionario Biográfico Almeriense, Instituto de Estudios Almerienses, 2006, p. 322.
 Vargas Vasserot, Carlos: "Aportaciones al Derecho concursal de Joaquín Rodríguez y José A. Ramírez", Estudios de Derecho Concursal (Coord. Peinado-Valenzuela), Marcial Pons, Madrid, 2006, pp. 533–541.

1987 deaths
1908 births
20th-century Spanish lawyers